Blind Rage may refer to:
 Blind rage, uncontrollable, psychologically-blinding rage
 Blind Rage (film), a 1978 blaxploitation film
 Blind Rage (album), an album by heavy metal band Accept